Madhu Reddy is a Professor in the School of Communication at Northwestern University. Previously he was a faculty member in the Penn State College of Information Sciences and Technology, and the School of Management and Information Systems at the University of Missouri-Rolla.

He is the recipient of the 2002 Diana Forsythe Prize given by the American Medical Informatics Association for the best paper of the year at the intersection of medical informatics and social science. Reddy currently chairs the Diana Forsythe Award Committee.

Education
Dr. Reddy received his Ph.D. in Information and Computer Science from the University of California, Irvine in 2005. He also holds two master's degrees: M.S. in Information and Computer Science from the University of California, Irvine (1999) and M.S. in Health Care Administration from the California State University, Long Beach (1995). He received his B.S. in Biological Sciences from the University of California, Irvine (1994) and B.A. in Political Science from the University of California, Irvine (1992).

Research
Dr. Reddy's research interests are Medical Informatics, Computer-Supported Cooperative Work, Human-Computer Interaction, and Information Sciences. He has published ten papers on academic journals or books, and eleven papers on peer-reviewed conference proceedings (till October 2007).

His previous research focused on examining how patient care team members used their knowledge of temporal features of work (e.g., temporal rhythms, trajectories, and horizons) for collaborative purposes.  The research provided a theoretical basis for understanding the centrality of temporality in collaborative work and highlighted the importance of incorporating temporal features into the design of information systems.

Most of his current research focuses on three major themes: (1) Collaborative information behavior; (2) Temporal features of collaborative work and (3) Collaborative support for teams. He explores these themes utilizing qualitative methods within the health care domain primarily in hospital environments.

His research collaborators include Paul Dourish, Wanda Pratt, John King, Mark Ackerman, Jonathan Grudin, Gloria Mark, John Yen, etc.

See also
 Medical Informatics
 Information Science
 Computer-Supported Cooperative Work
 Human-Computer Interaction

References

External links
 Madhu Reddy's homepage
 Penn State College of Information Sciences and Technology (IST)
 Introduction to Madhu Reddy at Penn State IST website

Year of birth missing (living people)
Living people
Health informaticians
Pennsylvania State University faculty
California State University, Long Beach alumni
University of California, Irvine alumni
Missouri University of Science and Technology faculty